Bill Murray (born 1955 in Chicago, Illinois) is an American cartoonist.

Life and work 
Bill Murray obtained a bachelor of fine arts degree in visual communications from the Art institute of Chicago, and served his art apprenticeship with Johnson Publishing Company, which publishes Ebony and Jet magazines.

In 2005 Murray became the seventh African-American to be nationally syndicated. His comic features are titled Jet News and The Golden Years.

In 1985 Murray created BAM Productions, a comic book company, and hired comic book artists Jerry Ordway, Ben Dunn, and Kevin Eastman (co-creator of the Teenage Mutant Ninja Turtles) to create the art for his comic books, Adam & Eve A.D., a series of comic books that are still sold on eBay and most comic book stores on the Internet.

Murray currently resides in Pennsylvania, where he writes a comic strip for the Real Times Media, Inc. The Detroit-based company owns a chain of six African-American newspapers, which includes The Chicago Defender and Pittsburgh Courier. Murray has been employed by the company since 1981, drawing a comic strip entitled Sonny Boy.

Murray's freelance editorial cartoons have appeared on CNN, FOX, USA TODAY, and he is represented by CSL Limited, which distributes his cartoons and illustrations around the world.

Murray is also a published children's book illustrator, with a series of books being published in July 2010.

References

External links

1955 births
Living people
American cartoonists
African-American comics creators
21st-century African-American people
20th-century African-American people